A tartane (also tartan, tartana) was a small ship used both as a fishing ship and for coastal trading in the Mediterranean. They were in use for over 300 years until the late 19th century. A tartane had a single mast on which was rigged a large lateen sail, and with a bowsprit and fore-sail. When the wind was aft a square sail was generally hoisted like a cross jack.

References

Google book search. Retrieved 2007-11-23
A Treatise on Insurances by Balthazard Marie Émérigon, Samuel Meredith, p330-331.  Google book search.

Merchant sailing ship types